John Andrew Logan (14 December 1923 – 22 December 2001) was an Australian rules footballer who played with Footscray in the Victorian Football League (VFL).

Notes

External links 

				
1923 births
Australian rules footballers from Victoria (Australia)
Western Bulldogs players
2001 deaths